Skipper Roberts is a doll created by Mattel in 1964 to be Barbie's younger sister.

Mattel redesigned Skipper in 2009, adding a colored streak to her hair and giving her a tech-savvy personality. According to her fictional biography, Skipper calls herself a gadget girl who likes computers and trying out the latest technology. In the Barbie movies, she likes to work on her photo blog.

Skipper's appearance has changed significantly since her introduction. The first Skipper doll was eight years old. She was designed as a response to requests for Barbie to have children; Mattel felt that a little sister would be a better choice instead. Skipper was later changed to a teenager, and a controversial "Growing Up Skipper" doll was created to demonstrate the change.

Fictional biography

According to the Random House novels of the 1960s, Skipper is the second child of George and Margaret Roberts of Willows, Wisconsin (their first child being Barbie). In these novels, she attended Baker Elementary, while the Marvel Comics of the early 1990s had her at Central Junior High School.

Since Skipper was re-released in 2009, she has had a new personality to match her redesigned appearance. She is described as a technology lover who likes "being a gadget girl and trying out the hottest techie toys." As of Barbie Dreamhouse Adventures, this iteration of Skipper is fourteen years old.

Skipper's new design has also been rendered in computer animation for her appearances in the Barbie film series and the TV series Barbie Dreamhouse Adventures. For the TV show, Skipper and her sisters were given "a realistic and modern CGI look" that was different from previous entries in the franchise.

Physical appearance 
Since Skipper was introduced, the dimensions of the doll have changed significantly. She was 9.25 inches in height (compared to Barbie's 11.5 inches) when she was first introduced, and then as newer versions were released, she gradually became taller with a teenage appearance. Usually, Skipper dolls have blue eyes.

Creation
Skipper was created, along with Midge, to counteract criticism that claimed Barbie was a sex symbol. Midge's facial appearance was gentler than Barbie's, whereas Skipper was a response to requests for Barbie to have children; however, instead of having a married, pregnant Barbie, which would make her too domestic, Barbie would babysit Skipper. As Barbie's little sister, Skipper was Barbie's first family member sold. Since their introduction in 1964, Skipper dolls have changed drastically.

Modern (1975–present)
In 1975 Growing Up Skipper was released. The gimmick of the doll, which led to much controversy in the newspapers, was that if Skipper's arm was rotated, the doll would become an inch taller and small breasts would appear on her rubber torso. This concept was later used for Mattel's My Scene brand in 2007 with the "Growing Up Glam" line, which was also controversial.  In 1979 Skipper's entire appearance changed. She was advertised as "Super Teen Skipper". She had a new body mold which included small, permanent breasts, and a different head mold that made her look slightly older. In 1985 Hot Stuff Skipper was released, which had another new head mold that included the addition of dimples and a longer face.

Skipper changed again in 1988 with the release of Teen Fun Skipper. Her new body mold was taller and more graceful. Her waist was more flexible and her breasts were slightly bigger. Her eyes were also enlarged, giving her a cartoon-like look. At this stage she appeared to be somewhere between 13 and 15 years old. Later, Skipper had a new head mold with smaller eyes in a Pizza Party line, but with the same body mold.

Finally, in 1997, Teen Skipper was introduced. She again had a new body mold and was now almost as tall as her sister Barbie. This was mostly because of her legs, which were now long and lanky. Most notable of all, however, was Skipper's new face mold. She no longer looked like a child, but more like a girl on the brink of becoming a woman. Teen Skipper's packaging revealed that she is now "16 years old". If she was nine when she was introduced (and she was), when Barbie was billed as the "Famous Teen-Age Fashion Doll", then Barbie could not realistically be considered a teenager any longer. Skipper also appeared to have larger breasts which continued the controversy over her sexualization that has dogged Skipper in the past.

Reproductions (1994–present)
In 1994 the first vintage reproduction Skipper was produced specifically for collectors to celebrate the 30th anniversary of Skipper's introduction. Instead of the usual vinyl, the dolls were made of porcelain. She wore a blue reproduction ensemble from 1965, known then as "Happy Birthday".  In 2007 Mattel released its second vintage 1964 reproduction Skipper doll, this time wearing her "School Days" ensemble and sold in a gift set along with a reproduction of a vintage swirl ponytail Barbie doll wearing the matching "Knitting Pretty" ensemble.

Popularity
Skipper Madison Roberts was the original little sister of Barbie, and has been quite popular over the years. When she first came out, she was an alternative for parents who did not approve of Barbie's adult figure. The first vintage Skipper dolls now have a value of US$195 MIB (Mint In Box). The brass headbands alone that came with these dolls have a value of $20. While vintage Skipper dolls, clothes, and accessories can sell for a lot of money, modern Skipper dolls usually only have a value of $10 to $20 MIB. If they have no box, the value may be only $5 or less.

Friends
Skipper's friends at the vintage stage were Skooter (1965), Ricky (1965), Living Fluff (1971), and Pose N' Play Tiff (1972). Skooter and Ricky had their own head molds, and both had freckles. Skooter was available with the same three hair colors as Skipper had, but Ricky was only available with molded red hair, similar to Midge's boyfriend, Allan Sherwood.  Fluff and Tiff shared a head mold which many collectors considered adorable, with a contagious smile.  Most of Skipper's first friends were never seen after the lines they were produced for, but another Skooter doll, called Fun Time Skooter, was produced for the European market. She had auburn hair, a Twist N' Turn waist, and bendable legs. However, she had the head mold of the oldest version of Skipper, not the older Skooter doll, which many collectors found strange.

Skipper's friend for the controversial Growing Up line was the brunette Ginger, made in 1976. However, after this line, Ginger was never seen again. Skipper's first boyfriend, Scott, was created in 1980, and was introduced the year after Super Teen Skipper came on the market. Scott sported puffy, brown 1980s-style hair. Skipper gained two new friends after Teen Fun Skipper was first introduced. They included the reddish haired friend Courtney, made in 1989, and her second boyfriend Kevin, created in 1990.

After Teen Skipper came on the market, her first African American friend appeared. Her name was Nikki, and she was made in 1997.  Teen Skipper was originally going to have a third boyfriend, Zach, who would have joined her in the "Totally Yo Yo" line, but for reasons unknown, he was never produced. Parents speculate that Zach would be too much of a sexual influence on Skipper and children. However, the head mold for the unreleased Zach Doll was later used for Generation Girl Blaine, the token boy in Barbie's "Generation Girl" Doll line.

Notes and references

1960s toys
Barbie
Child characters in advertising
Female characters in advertising
Mascots introduced in 1964
Toy mascots